Santa Genoveva/Goiânia International Airport  is the airport serving Goiânia, Brazil.

It is operated by CCR.

History
The airport was commissioned in 1955 although operations started a few years earlier. In 1974, Infraero started to operate the airport.

In 2010 the government of the state of Goiás, in order to encourage tourism and aviation reduced the tax on petrol from 15% to 3%. After such a reduction there was some interest from airlines to build a hub at Santa Genoveva airport but operational limitations prevented the immediate implementation of such a plan.

The old passenger terminal was capable of handling 600,000 passengers/year but in its last few years it had been operating beyond its capacity: in 2015 it handled more than 5 times its capacity. On May 9, 2016, a new passenger terminal located on the opposite side of the old and across the runway was opened. It is capable of handling 6,3 million passengers/year. This new terminal has 32 check-in counters and 8 jetways, apart from usual amenities such as stores and restaurants.

Previously operated by Infraero, on April 7, 2021 CCR won a 30-year concession to operate the airport.

Airlines and destinations

Accidents and incidents
22 February 1975: VASP Boeing 737-2A1 registration PP-SMU en route from Goiânia to Brasília was hijacked by 1 person who demanded ransom. The hijacker was taken down.
29 September 1988: VASP Boeing 737-300 registration PP-SNT operating flight 375 en route from Belo Horizonte-Confins to Rio de Janeiro was hijacked by 1 person who wanted to force a crash on the Palácio do Planalto, the official presidential workplace in Brasília. The pilot convinced the hijacker to divert to Goiânia where an emergency landing was made. The hijack ended with 1 victim.

Access

See also
List of airports in Brazil

References

External links

Airports in Goiás
Airports established in 1955
Goiânia
1955 establishments in Brazil